Gemena Airport is an airport serving Gemena, the capital of the Sud-Ubangi District in Sud-Ubangi province in the Democratic Republic of the Congo.

The Gemena non-directional beacon (Ident: GEM) is located on the field.

Airlines and destinations

See also

Transport in Democratic Republic of the Congo
List of airports in Democratic Republic of the Congo

References

External links
Gemena Airport at OpenStreetMap

Gemena Airport at OurAirports

Airports in Sud-Ubangi